Stephania crebra is a herbaceous perennial vine in the genus Stephania of the family Menispermaceae. It is native to Southeast Asia and was first described in Thailand in 1988 by L. L. Forman. It is one of 15 Stephania found only in northern Thailand, specifically in the province of Chiang Mai. It resembles Stephania reticulata but S. crebra has larger flowers but smaller drupes and endocarps.

See also
Chinese herbology: 50 fundamental herbs

References

crebra
Endemic flora of Thailand
Medicinal plants
Plants described in 1988